Russia has used various flags throughout its history.

Flags of the Russian Federation

State flag

Presidential flags

Military flags 

Following the collapse of the Soviet Union in 1991, for a brief time, many Soviet era flags were still in use until new designs replaced them in the early 2000s. The new flags of the Russian Armed Forces are heavily inspired by the regimental banners and flags of the late Imperial Russian Army and Navy.

Flags of service branches

Flags of the Ground Forces 
Flags of the arms of the Ground Forces of the Russian Federation

Flags of the Aerospace Forces
The Aerospace Forces are a branch of the Armed Forces of the Russian Federation, it has three arms, the Russian Air Force, the Air Defense Forces, and the Russian Space Forces. The Air Defense Forces does not have a flag.

Flags of the Rear of the Armed Forces

Military district flags

Banners of the Armed Forces
Each branch of the Armed Forces has a representative banner, one for the Ground Forces, the Aerospace Forces, the Navy, and one to represent the entire Armed Forces as a whole.

Victory Banner
The Victory Banner was a historical banner raised atop of the Reichstag building in Berlin, by the Red Army, on May 1, 1945. It signified the victory over Nazi Germany, and served as the main symbol of victory of the Soviet people. It was amended in Russian law in 1996, but with a new design to distance the new Russian state from any usage of Communist iconography. In 2007, following pressure from Red Army veterans, the original Victory Banner design replaced the 1996 variant, and has since then served its usage in virtually every single Victory Day parade held across Russia.

Command Standards

Paramilitary flags 
This section covers flags of the various government paramilitary organizations which are not part of the Russian military, but are structured similarly by ranking system, uniforms, and are equipped with both light and heavy arms

Flags of non-military security forces

Flags of special services

Pennants

Historical flags of Russia

Civil ensign and national flag 
Prior to the creation of the first official flag of Russia in 1858, several merchant flags were used to represent Russia, the most notable being the White, Blue, and Red tricolour devised by Tsar Peter the Great. The historical State Flags of Russia were signed by decree to officially represent the country as a whole. The Black, Yellow, and White tricolour became the first official flag of Russia in 1858, with previous flags being de facto unofficial flags of Russia.

Flag of the Soviet Union

Personal flags

Monarch's flag

Other Royal flags

Flag of the Supreme Ruler

Presidential Standard

Banners

Historical pennants

Proposed flags

Flags of Russian cities

See also

Flags of the federal subjects of Russia
List of Sakha flags
Flags used in Russian controlled areas of Ukraine

References

External links

Flags of Russia: Флаги России-VEXILLOGRAPHIA